Alberdingk (also: Alberdingk Thijm) is the name of a Dutch patrician family.

History
The oldest known family members is one Christoffel Johannszn. Alberding who lived in Langendahl in Hessen during the first half of the 17th century. His great-grandson Jonas Alberding converted to Roman Catholicism. His son, Johannes Heinrich Alberding (1719–1781) was a cooper and moved to Amsterdam. His grandson Johannes Heinrich, Joannes Franciscus Alberdingk Thijm (1788–1858), married  in 1819 Catharina Thijm (1793–1864); in 1834, through a royal decree he was given the permission to carry the name Alberdingk Thijm.

Notable members
 Josephus Albertus Alberdingk Thijm (1820–1889), writer and literature expert
 Karel Joan Lodewijk Alberdingk Thijm (1864–1952), writer who became known under the name Lodewijk van Deyssel.
 Petrus Paulus Maria Alberdingk Thijm (1827–1904), professor of literature and history at the university of Leuven.

Bibliography
Nederland's Patriciaat 50 (1964), p. 15-32.

Dutch patrician families